The Bust of Gabriele Fonseca is a sculptural portrait by the Italian artist Gian Lorenzo Bernini. Executed sometime between 1668 and 1674, the work is located in San Lorenzo in Lucina in Rome, Italy. Gabriele Fonseca was the doctor to Pope Innocent X.

See also
 List of works by Gian Lorenzo Bernini

Notes

References

Further reading

External links

1660s sculptures
1670s sculptures
Busts by Gian Lorenzo Bernini